Larry Donnell Mucker (born December 15, 1954) is a former American football wide receiver in the National Football League (NFL). He was drafted by the Tampa Bay Buccaneers in the ninth round of the 1977 NFL Draft. He played college football at Arizona State.

References

1955 births
Living people
American football wide receivers
Arizona State Sun Devils football players
Tampa Bay Buccaneers players